The archaeological site of Herxheim, located in the municipality of Herxheim in southwest Germany, was a ritual center and a mass grave formed by people of the Linear Pottery culture (LBK) culture in Neolithic Europe. The site is often compared to that of the Talheim Death Pit and Schletz-Asparn, but is quite different in nature. The site dates from between 5300 and 4950 BC.

Discovery
Herxheim was discovered in 1996 on the site of a construction project when locals reported finds of bones, including human skulls. The excavation was considered a salvage or rescue dig, as parts of the site were destroyed by the construction.

Culture

The people at Herxheim were part of the LBK culture. Local flint as well as flints from distant sources were also found.

Settlement
The structures at Herxheim suggested that of a large village spanning up to  surrounded by a sequence of ovoid pits dug over a duration of several centuries. These pits eventually cut into one another, forming a triple, semi-circular enclosure ditch split into three sections. The way the pits were dug over such a length of time, in addition to their use, suggests a pre-determined layout. The structures within the enclosure eroded over time, and "yielded only a small number of settlement pits and a few graves". These pits were either trapezoidal or triangular in nature.

Mass grave
The enclosure ditches around the settlement comprise at least 80 ovoid pits containing the remains of humans and animals, and material goods such as pottery (some rare and high-quality), bone and stone tools, and "rare decorative artifacts". The remains of dogs, often found intact, were also recovered.

The human remains were primarily shattered and dispersed within the pits, rarely intact or in anatomical position. Using a quantification process known as "minimum number of individuals" (MNI), researchers concluded that the site contained at least 500 individual humans ranging from newborns to the elderly. However, "since the area excavated corresponds to barely half the enclosure, we can assume that in fact more than 1000 individuals were involved". The deposition of the human remains occurred only within the final 50 years of occupation at the site.

Mortuary practices
The people at Herxheim practiced a type of burial known as secondary burial, which consists of the removal of the corpse or partial corpse and subsequent placement elsewhere. This is evident due to the lack of complete, articulated skeletons in the majority of the burials. Another possibility is that of sky burial, in which the corpse is exposed to the elements and many bones are carried off by scavengers.

A 2006 study revealed the intentional breakage and cutting of various human elements, particularly skulls. Bones were broken with stone tools in a peri-mortem state, as is evident by the fragmentation patterns on the bones, which differ between fresh and dry (old) conditions. The conclusion reached from this study was that the site of Herxheim was a ritual mortuary center - a necropolis - where the remains of the dead were not just buried, but for reasons unknown, destroyed.

A 2009 study confirmed many findings from the 2006 study, but added new information. In just one pit deposit, this study found 1906 bones and bone fragments from at least 10 individuals ranging from newborns to adults. At least 359 individual skeletal elements were identified. This in-depth study revealed many more cut, impact, and bite marks made upon the skulls and post-cranial skeletal elements. It was apparent that parts of the humans' bodies were singled out for their marrow content, suggesting cannibalization (see Hypotheses).

Note that due to the fractures present on the bones being peri-mortem, the blows to the bones could have been made immediately prior (including as cause of) or soon after death. However, because of their precision placement, a peri-mortem "Cause of Death" is not likely, and rather the impacts were placed after the bone was defleshed.

Skull cult practices
Of particular note from both studies was the peculiar treatment of the humans' skulls. Many skulls were treated in a similar manner: skulls were struck on "the sagittal line, splitting faces, mandibles, and skull caps into symmetrical halves". A few skulls were clearly skinned prior to being struck, again, all in the same manner: "horizontal cuts above the orbits, vertical cuts along the sagittal suture, and oblique cuts in the parietals".

The vault of the skull was preserved and shaped into what is referred to as a calotte (calvarium). During this process the brain, which is a source of dietary fat, may have been extracted. Additionally, a later study revealed that the tongues of humans were removed.

Hypotheses

Necropolis
Due to the transportation of distant pottery and flint, it was the conclusion of the 2006 study that Herxheim served as a necropolis for the LBK people of the area.
"The projection of the number of individuals present (...) to a probable total of 1,300 to 1,500 rules out the possibility of a local graveyard — and points a regional centre at Herxheim to which human remains were transported for the purpose of reburial. (...) To organise the transport not only of stone tools and pottery but also of human bones and partial or maybe even complete corpses implies an efficient organisational and communication system."

Ritual cannibalism
Whether for religious purpose or war, it is apparent from the 2009 study that the humans at the site of Herxheim were butchered and eaten. Not only were cut marks found on locations of the skeleton that are made during the dismemberment and filleting process, bones were also crushed for the purposes of marrow extraction, and chewed. Besides the fresh-bone fractures present on many bones, "[processing] for marrow is also documented by the presence of scrape marks in the marrow cavity on two fragments."

Skeletal representation analysis revealed that many of the "spongy bone" elements - such as the spinal column, patella, ilium, and sternum - were underrepresented compared to what would be expected in a mass grave. "All these observations are similar to those observed in animal butchery." Additionally, preferential chewing of the metapodials and hand phalanges "speak strongly in favour of human choice rather than more or less random action by carnivores".

"The number of people concerned at Herxheim obviously suggests that cannibalism for the simple purpose of survival is highly improbable, all the more so as the characteristics of the deposits show a standard, repetitive, and strongly ritualised practice".

Although a concrete conclusion has yet to be made, the archaeology does not rule out the possibility of deliberate travel to the complex with pottery, flint, and dead bodies (or partial bodies), with the intent to have the dead cannibalized and/or ritually destroyed. It also does not rule out the idea of human sacrifice.

Other archeologists reject the cannibalism hypothesis however, maintaining the evidence better fits a scenario in which the dead were reburied following dismemberment and removal of flesh from bones. "Evidence of ceremonial reburial practices has been reported for many ancient societies."

References

Further reading
Settlement Site Hints at Mass Cannibalism: Discovery News
Projekt Herxheim: Ongoing list of related publications in German, English, and French.

Archaeological sites in Germany
Neolithic Germany
Prehistoric cannibalism
Linear Pottery culture
Archaeology of Rhineland-Palatinate